Adrian Mannarino defeated Jordan Thompson in the final, 7–6(9–7), 6–3 to win the men's singles tennis title at the 2019 Rosmalen Grass Court Championships. It was Mannarino's maiden ATP Tour singles title in his seventh final. Thompson was also contesting for his maiden title. 

Richard Gasquet was the defending champion, but lost to Thompson in the semifinals.

Seeds
The top four seeds receive a bye into the second round.

Draw

Finals

Top half

Bottom half

Qualifying

Seeds

Qualifiers

Lucky loser
  Thomas Fabbiano

Qualifying draw

First qualifier

Second qualifier

Third qualifier

Fourth qualifier

References

 Main Draw
 Qualifying Draw

Libéma Open;- Singles
2019 Men's Singles